Ganj-e Qarun is a 1965 Iranian film directed by Siamak Yasemi and starring Mohammad Ali Fardin, Forouzan and Taqi Zohuri.

Background
In Persian folklore, Ganj-e Qarun (Qarun's Treasure) is a symbol of major wealth. Qarun is Persian for Korah, the biblical figure who lived contemporary to Moses.

Plot
Ali Bigham is a happy-go-lucky young man who accidentally saves a rich old man's life named Qarun who is attempting suicide. Qarun is very wealthy but also sad and alone. He is ill and has no one to live with. Ali takes Qarun to his home and realizes that he is his own father who left him and his mother years ago. At first Ali rejects his father, but then Qarun gains his son's attention. Throughout the film Hasan accompanies Ali as a comedian.

Cast
Mohammad Ali Fardin as Ali Bigham
Arman as Qarun
Taghi Zohuri as Hassan Jeqjeqeh
Forouzan as Shirin

References

External links
 

1965 films
1960s Persian-language films
Iranian black-and-white films
Iranian romantic drama films
Iranian musical films
1960s romantic musical films
1965 romantic drama films
Films shot in Iran
Films directed by Siamak Yasemi